Ewood Bridge and Edenfield railway station served the village of Edenfield, Rossendale, Lancashire.

History 
It dropped bombs on Ewood Bridge station which was destroyed.

The station was closed on 3 June 1972. The line was later reopened by the preserved East Lancashire Railway using a new (and replacement) station,  just south of the old site of Ewood Bridge.

References
Notes

Sources
Lost Railways of Lancashire by Gordon Suggitt, 

Disused railway stations in the Borough of Rossendale
Former Lancashire and Yorkshire Railway stations
Railway stations in Great Britain opened in 1846
Railway stations in Great Britain closed in 1972
Beeching closures in England